Estuaries and Coasts is a peer-reviewed scientific journal published by Springer Science+Business Media and the official journal of the Coastal and Estuarine Research Federation. It was established in 1960 as Chesapeake Science by Romeo J. Mansueti, covering research results and management studies on natural resources of the Chesapeake Bay region. In 1977, the journal was acquired by the Coastal and Estuarine Research Federation and in 1978 it was renamed Estuaries. It obtained its current name in 2006 (Vol. 29, Issue 1). Chesapeake Science was published and partially subsidized by the Chesapeake Biological Laboratory during its 18-year history. The co-editors-in-chief are Linda Deegan (Woodwell Climate Research Center) and Paul Montagna (Texas A&M University–Corpus Christi).

The journal has a 2021 impact factor of 3.032.

Scope 
Estuaries and Coasts publishes scholarly manuscripts on estuarine and near coastal ecosystems at the interface between the land and the sea where there are tidal fluctuations or sea water is diluted by fresh water. The interface is broadly defined to include estuaries and nearshore coastal waters including lagoons, wetlands, tidal fresh water, shores and beaches, but not the continental shelf. The journal covers research on physical, chemical, geological or biological processes, as well as applications to management of estuaries and coasts. The journal publishes original research findings, reviews and perspectives, techniques, comments, and management applications.

References

External links 
 

English-language journals
Environmental science journals
Publications established in 1977
Springer Science+Business Media academic journals
Bimonthly journals